Ageneiosus pardalis is a species of driftwood catfish of the family Auchenipteridae. It can be found in the Maracaibo Lake.

References

Bibliography
Eschmeyer, William N., ed. 1998. Catalog of Fishes. Special Publication of the Center for Biodiversity Research and Information, num. 1, vol. 1–3. California Academy of Sciences. San Francisco, California, United States. 2905. .

Ageneiosus
Taxa named by Christian Frederik Lütken
Fish described in 1874
Fish of Venezuela